Novikau is a Belarusian surname.  Notable people with the surname include:

 Aliaksandr Novikau (born 1985), Belarusian rower
 Mikalai Novikau (born 1986), Belarusian weightlifter
 Siarhei Novikau (born 1982), Belarusian judoka
 Siarhei Novikau (born 1989), Belarusian boxer
 Yauheni Novikau (born 1996), Belarusian acrobatic gymnast

Belarusian-language surnames